Farsesh Rural District is a rural district (dehestan) in the Central District of Aligudarz County, Lorestan Province, Iran. At the 2006 census, its population was 3,132, in 608 families.  The rural district has 6 villages.

References 

Rural Districts of Lorestan Province
Aligudarz County